Benedenheul is a hamlet in the Dutch province of South Holland. It is a part of the municipality of Krimpenerwaard, and lies about 7 km south of Gouda.

The statistical area "Benedenheul", which also can include the surrounding countryside, has a population of around 240.

Until 2015, Benedenheul was part of Vlist.

References

Populated places in South Holland
Krimpenerwaard